Cewice is a non-operational PKP railway station in Cewice (Pomeranian Voivodeship), Poland.

Lines crossing the station

References 
Cewice article at Polish Stations Database, URL accessed at 27 March 2006

Railway stations in Pomeranian Voivodeship
Disused railway stations in Pomeranian Voivodeship
Lębork County